The Murray–Darling basin is a large geographical area in the interior of southeastern Australia, encompassing the drainage basin of the tributaries of the Murray River, Australia's longest river, and the Darling River, a right tributary of the Murray and Australia's third-longest river.  The basin, which includes six of Australia's seven longest rivers and covers around one-seventh of the Australian landmass, is one of the country's most significant agricultural areas providing one-third of Australia's food supply.  Located west of the Great Dividing Range, it drains southwestly into the Great Australian Bight and spans most of the states of New South Wales and Victoria, the Australian Capital Territory, and parts of the states of Queensland (the lower third) and South Australia (the southeastern corner).

Most of the  basin is flat, low-lying and far inland, and receives little direct rainfall. The many rivers it contains tend to be long and slow-flowing, and carry a volume of water that is large only by Australian standards.

The Snowy Mountains Scheme provides some security of water flows to the Murray–Darling basin, providing approximately 2,100 gigalitres (7.4×1010 cu ft) of water a year to the basin for use in Australia's irrigated agriculture industry, which is worth about A$3 billion per annum, representing more than 40% of the gross value of the nation's agricultural production.

The original inhabitants
The basin was once home to a large number of Aboriginal people whose traditional lifestyle and cultures were gradually altered by the arrival of Europeans, while others were outright killed by the settlers. Although some tribes organised resistance, such as the Maraura, whose territory lay around the Rufus River above Renmark and the Tanganekald near The Coorong, they were eventually either killed, exiled, or succumbed to disease.

Native fauna
The Murray–Darling basin is home to many native animal species. The true numbers may not be known, but a fairly confident estimate has been made of these animals and the current status of their population. The study found  that there were:

 80 species of mammals, with 62 extinct and 10 endangered
 55 species of frogs, with 18 endangered
 46 species of snakes, with five endangered
 five species of turtles, with none endangered
 34 species of fish, with up to half of them either threatened or of conservation significance

Historical records show that the previous abundances of fish provided a reliable food source. The bountiful fish became concentrated when the early stages of a flood left shallow water across the floodplain. Today, roughly 24 native freshwater fish and another 15-25 marine and estuarine species are existent in the basin, a very low biodiversity.

2018–2019 fish kill
Over Christmas 2018 and January 2019 there were two mass deaths of fish in the waters of the basin, the first numbering 10,000, the second in the hundreds of thousands. Species affected were Murray cod, golden perch, silver perch and bony herring. Some blamed the draining of water from the Menindee Lakes by WaterNSW, with only 2.5% of the original water volume in the lakes being left; after the first fish kill, both the Department of Primary Industries (DPI) and WaterNSW blamed the ongoing drought affecting Australia, while the DPI blamed the second kill on a disruption of an algal bloom caused by a sudden fall in temperature.

2023 fish kill
In March 2023, millions of fish were reported dead along the Darling River at Menindee, following a heatwave. As the cleanup began, police attributed the cause to (naturally occurring) hypoxic blackwater.

Introduced species
Four varieties of carp were used to stock up fish dams. Since then they have made their way into the river systems, where they spread quite quickly. Human introduction, possibly by anglers using small carp illegally as live bait, has also increased their distribution. These fish are very mobile, breed rapidly and can survive in very shallow water and through long periods of very low dissolved oxygen content.

Carp are a problem because they feed by sucking gravel from the riverbed and taking all the edible material off it, before returning the rest to the water. This stirs up all the sediment, reducing the quality of the water. A project for developing daughterless carp shows promise for eliminating carp from the river system.

Cane toads have entered the upper reaches of the Darling Basin and there are several reports of individuals being found further down the system. Cane toads compete with native amphibians and are toxic to native carnivores.

Phyla canescens has invaded wetlands and floodplains with heavy clay soils in the Murray–Darling basin, to the detriment of the native vegetation; the plant does best in habitats that are inundated occasionally, although it cannot compete with the grass Paspalum distichum and the sedge Eleocharis plana in more heavily inundated sites.

Physiography
This area is one of the physiographic provinces of the larger East Australian basins division, and encompasses the smaller Naracoorte Platform and Encounter Shelf physiographic sections.

This is the lowest rate of the world's major river systems. About 6.0 percent of Australia's total rainwater falls into the basin. In most years only half of this quantity reaches the sea and in dry years much less. Despite the magnitude of the basin, the hydrology of the streams within it is quite varied.

These waters are divided into four types:

 The Darling and Lachlan basins. These have extremely variable flows from year to year, with the smallest annual flow being typically as little as 1 percent of the long-term mean and the largest often more than ten times the mean. Periods of zero flow in most rivers can extend to months and in the drier parts (Warrego, Paroo and Lower Darling basins) to years. Flows in these rivers are not strongly seasonal. In the northern regions the majority of floods occur in the summer from monsoonal penetration. For most of the Darling and Lachlan catchments it is typical to see high or low flows begin in winter and extend to the following autumn (see El Niño). High water extraction rates for irrigation and mining have heavily compromised these rivers.
 The southwestern basins (Campaspe, Loddon, Avoca, Wimmera). These have a marked winter rainfall maximum and relatively lower precipitation variability than the Lachlan or Darling. However, the age and infertility of the soils mean that run-off ratios are exceedingly low (for comparison, around a tenth that of a European or North American catchment with a similar climate). Thus, variability of runoff is very high and most of the terminal lakes found in these basins very frequently dry up. Almost all runoff occurs in the winter and spring and, in the absence of large dams for regulation, these rivers are often seasonally dry during summer and autumn.
 A number of small catchments in South Australia, of which the largest are the Angas River flowing through Strathalbyn and the Finniss River further west, are part of the Murray–Darling Basin. These catchments lead to Lake Alexandrina, one of the lakes at the end of the Murray system. The Angas River is often dry in summer because of high levels of water extraction. The Finniss River has permanent flow into Lake Alexandrina but was cut off by a weir for several years of drought in the early 21st century.
 The Murray, Murrumbidgee and Goulburn (except the Broken River which resembles the southwestern basins) Basins. Because these catchments have headwaters in alpine country with relatively young peaty soils, the runoff ratios are much higher than in other parts of the basin. Consequently, although gross precipitation variability is no lower than in the Lachlan or Darling basins, runoff variability is markedly lower than in other parts of the basin. Typically these rivers never cease to flow and the smallest annual flow is around 30 percent of the long-term mean and the largest around three times the mean. In most cases the flow peaks very strongly with the spring snow melt and troughs in mid-autumn.

The two principal rivers of the basin, the Murray and Darling, bring water from the high ranges of the east and carry it west then south through long flat and dry inland areas, often resulting in alluvial channel wetlands, such as The (Great) Cumbung Swamp, at the terminus of the Lachlan and Murrumbidgee Rivers. Nevertheless, these waters are subject to major diversions for municipal drinking supplies and irrigated agriculture that began in the 1890s. Currently, 4 major reservoirs, 14 lock and weir structures, and five coastal barrages interject the water flowing down the Murray–Darling. Agricultural irrigation accounts for about 95 percent of the water removed, including for the growing of rice and cotton. This extraction is highly controversial among scientists in Australia, regarding the agriculture industry's high water use in a region extremely short of water (as much due to exceptionally low run-off coefficients as to low rainfall). These extensive irrigation systems require a reliable supply of water, not the unpredictable flows that characterise the Murray–Darling. These structures and irrigation implements were ideal when there was a steady flow of water. However, during "the Big Dry", as the early 2000s drought came to be known, Australian farmers experienced a scarcity unlike ever before. The drought was so severe that numerous rivers and streams such as the Murray–Darling stopped flowing. The basin contains more than 30,000 wetlands. Eleven of these are protected under the Ramsar Convention of Wetlands of International Importance.

Rivers in the Murray–Darling basin

The rivers listed below comprise the Murray–Darling basin and its direct significant tributaries, with elevations of their confluence with the downstream river.

The ordering of the basin, from downstream to upstream, is:

Murray–Darling Basin Initiative

Background
The basin affects five states and territory governments, which according to the Constitution, are responsible for managing water resources. The River Murray Commission was established in 1917. Under the River Murray Waters Agreement, which did not include Queensland though about a quarter of the basin lays in the state, the commission was an advisory body with no authority for enforcement of provisions. For a long time the commission was only concerned with water quantity until salinity became a problem. This led to minor reforms in 1982 in which water quality became part of the commission's responsibilities.

However, it was soon recognised that a new organisational structure which considered the national perspective was needed for effective management. The Murray–Darling Basin Agreement was first adopted in 1985 but it wasn't until 1993 that its full legal status was enacted. The Agreement led to the creation of a number of new organisations under what is known as the Murray–Darling Basin Initiative. These included the Murray–Darling Basin Ministerial Council and the Murray Darling Basin Commission.

Murray–Darling Basin Plan

The Murray–Darling Basin Authority (MDBA) was formed in 2008 to manage the Murray–Darling basin in an integrated and sustainable manner, in conjunction with the Basin states.  The MDBA is responsible for preparing and overseeing a legally-enforceable management plan. In October 2010, MDBA released a draft Murray–Darling Basin Plan (MDBP) for consultation. After a difficult consultation process, on 22 November 2012, Tony Burke, Minister for Sustainability, Environment, Water, Population and Communities, signed the Murray–Darling Basin Plan, which passed the Australian Parliament's disallowance period on 19 March 2013.

Community consultation
The MDBA's draft Murray–Darling Basin Plan, titled the Guide to the Proposed Murray–Darling Basin Plan, was released in October 2010 as the first part of a three-stage process to address the problems of the Murray–Darling basin. The Plan was in response to the 2000s Australian drought, and designed to secure the long-term ecological health of the Murray–Darling basin. This entailed cutting existing water allocations and tree growth environmental flows. The Basin Plan was designed to set environmentally sustainable limits on the quantities of water that may be taken from Basin water resources, to set Basin-wide environmental, water quality and salinity objectives, to develop efficient water trading regimes across the Basin, to set requirements for state water resource plans and to improve water security for all Basin users. It also intends to minimise social and economic impacts whilst achieving the plan's environmental outcomes.

With the release of the Guide to the Proposed Murray–Darling Basin Plan there have been a number of protests and voiced concerns about the plan in rural towns that the MDBA visited to present the plan to consultation meetings. More than 5,000 people attended a MDBA meeting in Griffith where Griffith Mayor, Mike Neville, said the plan would "obliterate" Murrumbidgee valley communities. Other groups also echo this feeling, such as the Victorian Farmers Federation and Wine Group Growers' Australia. Conversely, support for the Murray–Darling Basin plan has been received by various groups, including Australian Conservation Foundation, and Environment Victoria.

New legal advice from Commonwealth government lawyers is changing the plan. The Government's interpretation is that the plan must give equal weight to the environmental, social, and economic impacts of proposed cuts to irrigation.

Environmentalists and South Australian irrigators, at the end of the river in South Australia, say that the authority should stick to its original figure.

In October 2010, a parliamentary inquiry into the economic impacts of the plan was announced.

In late October 2010 the Water Minister, Tony Burke, played down the prospect of a High Court challenge to the Murray–Darling Basin plan, as confusion continued over new legal advice released by the Government. In response to community concerns that MDBA had put environmental issues first over social and economic needs, Burke released new advice on the requirements of the Water Act. Burke stated that the Act does allow for the authority to "optimise" the needs of all three areas, but constitutional lawyer, George Williams, had cast doubts over the interpretation of the laws, stating it could be subject to a legal challenge.

The MDBA announced in November 2010 that it might be forced to push back the release of its final plan for the river system until early 2012.

The then MDBA chairman, Mike Taylor, reassured the public meeting that more work is being done to look at how the proposed cuts would affect regional communities. He stated: "Importantly, we want to make sure the social and economic impacts—which under any sort of scenario is very significant—were fully teased out". Taylor resigned as he allegedly believed that the overriding principle should be the environmental outcome which was in conflict with the Gillard Government and following a period of sustained criticism of the Authority and the implementation of the proposed draft basin plan. He was replaced by former New South Wales Planning Minister, Craig Knowles.

In late May 2012, the revised plan was forwarded to state water ministers. It did not alter the recommendation to cut  of water entitlements.

Following much negotiation between the Commonwealth and State governments and numerous submissions from interested stakeholders and the community, the Basin Plan became law in November 2012 and can now be implemented.

Sustainability and risks
Although the Murray–Darling Basin Plan (MDBP) is a step towards sustainability the measures keep a significant risk of human activities exacerbating the drought risk (see River Murray which has only dried up twice since records began). However, objectors  cite socioeconomic impacts of major cutbacks to the widescale farming (and in some areas wine-growing) in the basin, and conclude that within plans for population growth, particularly in times of drought, may be a need for sustainable water transportation from new extraction from rivers in the wettest part of the country—the Cape York Peninsula—or more desalination.

See also

 Climate change in Australia
 Drought in Australia
 Murray–Darling Cap
 List of drainage basins of Australia
 List of Darling River distances
 List of Murray River crossings
 List of Murray River distances
 List of Murrumbidgee River distances
 Murray Basin, the geological sedimentary basin

References

External links
 Murray–Darling Basin Authority
 Murray–Darling Basin Water Budget Project
 Murray Darling Freshwater Research Centre
 River Murray Water Restrictions
 Murray Outback - Guide to the major towns on the Murray and Murray Outback Region.
 Save the Murray - lobby group
 Murray Darling Basin Resources
 The Basin Plan
 Guide to the Proposed Basin Plan
 Guide to the Basin Plan, Volumes 1 - 21
 Basin Plan - lobby group

News
 

Regions of Australia
Drainage basins of Australia
Physiographic provinces
Freshwater ecoregions